Kalhuhuraa as a place name may refer to:
 Kalhuhuraa (Kaafu Atoll) (Republic of Maldives)
 Kalhuhuraa (Laamu Atoll) (Republic of Maldives)
 Kalhuhuraa (Vaavu Atoll) (Republic of Maldives)